The women's 800 metres event at the 2015 European Athletics Indoor Championships was held on 6 March at 12:15 (heats), on 7 March at 18:00 (semifinals) and on 8 March at 15:15 (final) local time.

Medalists

Results

Heats
Qualification: First 2 of each heat (Q) and the next 4 fastest (q) qualified for the semifinals.

Semifinals
Qualification: First 3 of each semifinal (Q) qualified directly for the final.

Final

References

2015 European Athletics Indoor Championships
800 metres at the European Athletics Indoor Championships
2015 in women's athletics